Ali Esmaeil Dehkordi (born 8 November 1965 in Shahrekord) is an Iranian actor. He began his acting career with From Karkheh to Rhine,  a film produced by Ebrahim Hatamikia in 1992.

Filmography

Cinema
From Karkheh to Rhine (1992)
Paeez Boland (1994)
Roze Sheytan (1995)
Sheykhe Mofid (1996)
Mah o Khorshid (1996)
Abor Az Khate Sorkh (1996)
Khalaban (1997)
Mah o Khorshid (1997)
Sejdeh Bar Ab (1997)
Gahi Be Aseman Negah Kon (2003)
Salam (2004)
An Mard Amad (2008)
Democracy at the Sun (2009)
Ekhrajiha 3 (2010)
Mr. President's telephone (2011)

TV Series
Mehr O Mah (1992)
Mozdeh Tars (1993)
Dar Ghalbe Man (1996)
Akharin Gonah (2002)
Sheykhe Baha'i (2008)
Mosafereh Zaman (2008)
Malakoot (2010)
Ehzar (2021)

See also 
Iranian cinema

References

Iranian male film actors
1965 births
Living people
University of Tehran alumni